The Samsung Galaxy Tab S8 is a series of Android-based tablets designed, developed and marketed by Samsung Electronics. Unveiled at Samsung's Galaxy Unpacked event on 9 February 2022, they serve as the successor to the Galaxy Tab S7 series.

History 
The Samsung Galaxy Tab S8, the S8+ and the S8 Ultra were announced on 9 February 2022 and released on 25 February 2022.

Design

Colors

Tab S8 and S8+

Tab S8 Ultra

Specifications

Hardware

Chipset 
All tablets feature a Qualcomm Snapdragon 8 Gen 1 system on a chip. The SoC is based on the 4 nm processing technology node. The tablets also feature an Adreno 730 GPU.

Storage 
The Galaxy Tab S8 and Tab S8+ are available in 128, and 256 GB options,  and Galaxy Tab S8 Ultra is available in 128, 256, and 512 options, not all capacity variants are available. 1 TB of expansion can be added using a microSD card. The base amount of RAM is 8 GB, and is upgradeable to 16 GB.

Camera 
The Tab S8 and Tab S8+ are equipped with a 12 MP, F/2.4 front camera, and the rear camera consists of a 13 MP, a main camera with a cooking value of 2.0, and a 6 MP and F/2.2.

The Tab S8 Ultra features a 12 MP, F/2.2 wide-angle, 12 MP and F/2.4 ultra-wide-angle front camera, with a 13 MP rear camera, a main camera with a cooking value of 2.0, and a 6 MP and F/2.2 ultra-wide-angle camera.

Display 
The Tab S8 is equipped with a TFT LCD display with an 11-inch 2560 x 1600 resolution, with a screen ratio of 16:10. The scanning rate can be adjusted from 48 Hz to 120 Hz.

The Tab S8+ features a super AMOLED display with a resolution of 2800 x 1752 in 12.4 inches, with a screen ratio of 16:10. The scanning rate can be adjusted from 48 Hz to 120 Hz.

The Tab S8 Ultra is equipped with a super AMOLED display with a resolution of 2960 x 1848 measuring 14.6 inches, with a screen ratio of 16:10. The scanning rate can be adjusted from 48 Hz to 120 Hz.

Software 
The operating system is Android 12 with One UI 4.1.

Regions 
Starting with the Galaxy Tab S8 series, the CSC codes are consolidated together. This means that Samsung will speed up the firmware update process for these devices in more regions. Fewer Country Specific Codes (CSCs) means that official Samsung software updates will reach local markets faster.

Some countries on this list may be shown separately during the initial setup process.

OXM 
This CSC group applies to the rest of the world. These CSC codes will work for all variants unless specified.

Regions/carriers marked with an asterisk (*) cannot be used with the Call and Text on Other Devices feature.

South Korea 
Wi-Fi only variants sold in this market do not have any carrier-specific CSC codes, but they still use the OXM Multi-CSC for expanded language and region support unlike their cellular counterparts, which use the OKR Multi-CSC.
 KOO: 
 KT
 LG Uplus
 SK Telecom

North America 
Wi-Fi only variants sold in this market do not have any carrier-specific CSC codes, but they still use the OXM Multi-CSC for expanded language and region support unlike their cellular counterparts, which use the OYM/OYN and OYA/OYV Multi-CSCs for the US and Canada, respectively.
 XAC: 
 Bell
 Fido
 Freedom Mobile
 Koodo
 Rogers
 Shaw
 Telus
 Virgin Plus
 XAR: 
 AT&T *
 T-Mobile
 US Cellular
 Verizon *

Latin America 
ZBR is the newly consolidated CSC code for the Latin America region.

 MXO: 
 ZTO: 
 ZBR: All other Latin America regions
 PEO: 
 ARO: 
 BVO: 
 CHO: 
 COO: 
 UPO: 
 UYO: 
 EON: 
 GTO: 
 TPA:

Europe 
 CPW: Devices sold through the Carphone Warehouse
 EUX/EUY: EEA
 ATO: 
 AUT: Switzerland
 
 
 BGL: 
 BTU: British Isles
 
 
 DBT: 
 EUR: 
 ITV: Italian Peninsula
 
 
 
 
 LUX: Luxembourg
 
 
 NEE: Nordic Countries
 
 
 
 
 
 PHE: Spain
 
 
 PHN: 
 SEB: Baltic States
 
 
 
 SEE: Southeast Europe
 
 
 
 
 
 
 SIO: Yugoslavia
 
 
 TPH: 
 ROM: 
 XEF: French Peninsula
 
 
 XEH: 
 XEO: 
 XEZ: 
 XSK:

CIS 
 SEK: 
 Vodafone
 Kyivstar
 Lifecell
 TriMob
 SER: 
 MTS
 Beeline
 Megafon
 Tele2
 CAU: Caucasus countries
 
 A1
 MTS
 Life
 
 Magticom
 Silknet
 Beeline
 
 Ucom
 Viva-MTS
 Beeline (Telecom Armenia)
 SKZ: 
 Beeline
 Altel
 Kcell
 Tele2

Middle East & North Africa 
XSG, previously only for the UAE, now serves the entire Middle East region.

 ACR:  (5G only)
 AFR:  (5G only)
 DKR:  (5G only)
 ECT:  (5G only)
 EGY:  (5G only)
 ILO: 
 ILP: Levantine Coast (5G only)
 KSA:  (5G only)
 MWD:  (5G only)
 SKZ:  (5G only)
 TUN:  (5G only)
 TUR: 
 XFA:  (5G only)
 XFV: Vodafone/Vodacom
 XFE: Southern Africa (5G only)
 XSG: All other Middle East regions
 XSG: Arabian Peninsula
 
 
 
 
 
 MID: Fertile Crescent

India 
 INS: 
 SLK:  (5G only)

Asia Pacific 
XSP, previously only for Singapore, now serves the Asia Pacific region (Southeast Asia & Oceania). The display languages for Lao, Burmese, and Khmer are still exclusive to this market, even though they are present on the firmware.

The region locking for the Wi-Fi only variant now adds Australia and New Zealand to the Asia Pacific region.

 XSP: Asia Pacific
 XME: 
 XSA: 
 TEL: Telstra
 XNZ: 
 XTC: 
 Mainland Southeast Asia (Indochinese Peninsula)
 THL: 
 CAL:  & 
 MYM: 
 Maritime Southeast Asia (Malay Archipelago)
 XSP:  & 
 MM1: M1 Mobile
 SIN: SingTel
 STH: Star Hub
 XXV:

China 
 BRI: 
 TGY:  &

Notes 
 As with previous tablets, in most regions, the Call and Text on Other Devices feature can only be activated with a mobile phone issued from a mobile operator within the same region that the tablet was purchased from. Calls totaling five minutes or longer need to be placed before mobile phones from other regions can be used.

References

External links 
 Official website
 Tab S8 Detailed Specifications

Samsung Galaxy Tab series
Android (operating system) devices
Galaxy Tab
Tab
Tablet computers
Tablet computers introduced in 2022